Steady On is the debut studio album by American singer-songwriter Shawn Colvin, released on October 17, 1989 by Columbia Records. In addition to launching Colvin's career the album was positively received by critics and had moderate commercial success.

Recording and release
Colvin has explained that the themes on the album include healing from personal life trauma and drug and alcohol addiction.

Colvin recorded acoustic versions of these songs for 2019's Steady On: 30th Anniversary Acoustic Edition.

Reception
Steady On won the award for Best Contemporary Folk Album at the 33rd Grammy Awards in February 1991. Allmusic calls the album, "a must have for anyone who loves acoustic music created in the grand tradition of Joni Mitchell and James Taylor." Notable guest appearances include Suzanne Vega and Bruce Hornsby.

The album reached 111 on the Billboard 200 in 1989. The title track was released as a single and in 1990 reached 30 on the Billboard Adult Contemporary chart and 23 on the Modern Rock Tracks chart.

Track listing

Arrangement ideas were contributed by T-Bone Wolk and Phil Galdston on "Diamond in the Rough" and David Sanborn on "Another Long One".

Personnel

Musicians
 Steve Addabbo – tambourine
 Michael Blair – drums, percussion
 Shawn Colvin – lead vocals, guitar, keyboards, background vocals
 Charles Curtis – cello
 Steve Gaboury – keyboards, drum programming
 Bruce Hornsby – piano
 Lucy Kaplansky – background vocals
 John Leventhal – guitar, bass, mandolin, keyboards, tambourine, background vocals, drum programming
 Hugh McCracken – guitar, dobro, high-strung guitar
 Dennis McDermott – drums
 Rick Marotta – drums
 Bob Riley – guitar, keyboards, drum programming
 Bob Telson – organ
 Soozie Tyrell – fiddle, background vocals
 Suzanne Vega – background vocals on "Diamond in the Rough"
 T-Bone Wolk – guitar, bass, accordion

Production 
 Steve Addabbo – co-producer, engineer
 Paul Angelli – assistant engineer
 Kris Brauninger – assistant engineer
 Carol Chen – art direction
 Ronald K. Fierstein – executive producer
 Phil Galdston – assistant arranger
 Kevin Halpin – engineer
 Geoff Keehn – engineer
 Kevin Killen – mixing
 Phil Klum – assistant engineer
 John Leventhal – co-producer
 Bob Ludwig – mastering
 Marcus Miller – assistant engineer
 UE Nastasi – assistant engineer
 Frank Ockenfels – photography
 Mark Partis – engineer
 Malcolm Pollack – engineer
 David Sanborn – assistant arranger, arrangement collaboration
 Ted Spencer – engineer
 Dary Sulich – assistant engineer

Charts

Release history

References

External links
"Rock on the Net: Shawn Colvin", a timeline of Colvin's releases, awards

1989 debut albums
Shawn Colvin albums
Albums produced by John Leventhal
Columbia Records albums
Albums produced by Steve Addabbo